Tom Vaughn may refer to:
Tom Vaughn (musician) (1937–2011), American jazz pianist and Episcopalian priest
Tom Vaughn (American football) (1943–2020), former professional American football safety

See also
Thomas Vaughan (disambiguation)
Tom Vaughan (disambiguation)